The Divine Mercy Statue in Marilao, Bulacan, is a  Roman Catholic monument of Jesus Christ as the Divine Mercy. It is the tallest statue of the Divine Mercy in the Philippines.

History
The Divine Mercy Statue project in Marilao, Bulacan, was a concept by Filipino priest Prospero Tenorio, who is also the secretary general of the Asian office of the World Apostolic Congress on Mercy (WACOM) and the shrine rector and parish priest of the National Shrine of the Divine Mercy.

Construction of the statue began in January 2016 and was unveiled on January 19, 2017, as part of the 4th WACOM, the first edition of the congress held in Asia, despite the project only being 70 percent complete with finishing touches to be done on the statue's neck and shoulders.

A Mass was held as part of the inauguration, with Nigerian Bishop Martin Uzoukwu officiating in lieu of Malolos Bishop Jose Francisco Oliveros who is already too weak due to prostate cancer. The Mass was attended by around 5,000 people.

At the time of its inauguration, it was the tallest statue of the Divine Mercy in the Philippines.

Architecture and design
The Divine Mercy Statue is situated within the grounds of the National Shrine of the Divine Mercy. The structure consists of a statue and a building which serves as its podium. The building serves as a multi-purpose hall and a dormitory.
The design is based on the original painting of the divine mercy and interpreted and sculpted in 3d software. After the design process and 3d sculpting it is 3d printed part by part using the modern large format 3d printing and then coated by fiber glass to make the sculpture last long

Local construction, architectural, and engineering firm V.B. Columna was involved in the project.

References

External link

Colossal statues of Jesus
Buildings and structures in Bulacan
Monuments and memorials in the Philippines
Divine Mercy